Canoa or La Canoa is a small town in Villa Clara Province, Cuba, in the vicinity of the Sagua la Chica River. Nearby towns include Vega Alta, La Levisa, Chicharón, Paso Real, Santa Ana, La Doncella, and La Catalina.
“Canoa” translates to “Canoe” in Spanish.

History 
The Cuban War of Independence brought great concerns in Camajuaní which is in the border of Canoa. On October 30, 1895. Leoncio Vidal, a Cuban revolutionary with his troops attacked Fort La Vigía in Hills of Santa Fe nearby the Camajuaní, Santa Clara border and he put orders to attack the Canoa Bridge on the Sagua la Chica River and the Tuinicu bridge. 

In 1933 Cuban revolutionary Juan Francisco Aro Fernandez was born in Canoa, Cuba.

Culture
Jesús Menéndez public library has three video rooms located in Canoa, Progreso, and Castaño for the hamlets cultures.

See also 
 La Luz, Cuba
 Aguada de Moya, Cuba
 La Quinta, Cuba
 Luis Arcos Bergnes

References 

Populated places in Villa Clara Province